Dudão is a Brazilian children's comic book series created by former evangelical pastor Eduardo Samuel da Silva in cooperation with his brother the artist Jairo Alves da Silva in 1992. The comic with a educational and religious focus was created with the aim of evangelizing children and showing positive messages. The comic book had its first 5 issues published by Louvor in 1992, returning in 1994 by the publisher Vida, where in addition to having the first issues republished, it also had new issues being sold until 1997. During the years of publication the comic derived several other media products, including an LP album sung by Aline Barros (in her early career) released in the same year that the comic debuted.

Synopsis 
The story behind the Dudão comics is set in a Brazilian neighborhood in Rio de Janeiro, focusing on a group of children. The main character, Dudão, is a Christian boy who always teaches his friends what is right and what is wrong, although he is often bullied because of his weight. All other characters are also mocked due to one trait or another in them.

Characters 
Dudão, the title protagonist. An obese and religious boy, he is often trying to educate his friends and prevent them from committing bad deeds. In most of his speeches he always mentions "God" and "Jesus".
Binho, Dudão's best friend. He is also religious like Dudão, is usually tantrum and weeping and is often calmed by Dudão. He shows a rivalry with Zuca.
Rebeca, friend of Dudão and Binho and also the only girl in the gang. She is also religious, but tends to be the most aggressive and rebellious of the trio, usually being scolded by Dudão.
Paçoca, a naughty little boy that is one of the antagonists in the comic. He has blond hair, and he is often making malicious pranks (usually with Zuca, Pita and Tato) for fun that are usually disapproved by Dudão who tries to scold him. He tends to be the most arrogant of the gang.
Zuca, a afro-descendant boy who is also one of the antagonists of the comic. He comes from a slightly poor family, is a bit aggressive and usually makes malicious pranks with Paçoca, Pita and Tato, that are usually disapproved by Dudão.
Pita, a nerd boy who is also one of the antagonists of the comic. He wears glasses, a cap and has blond hair. Usually accompanies Paçoca, Zuca and Tato in malicious pranks that Dudão disapproves. Shows interest in video games and futuristic styles.
Tato, another boy who is also one of the antagonists of the comic. He tends to be the most athlete, but he is also a bit aggressive. Usually accompanies Paçoca, Zuca and Tato in malicious pranks that Dudão disapproves.
Baldinho, the youngest boy in the gang who is a friend of Dudão. He usually speaks a few words and repeats what others say.
Lipão, a religious boy that is friend of Dudão, Binho, Rebeca and Baldinho. He has few appearances in the comics.
Seu Jesão, Dudão's father.
Peludo, Dudão's pet cat.

Reception 
In an academic survey carried out in 2011, the character Dudão was the 6th most remembered by children among Brazilian comic book characters.

Internet popularity 
In 2020, the comic became an internet meme after scans were found on the internet, being rediscovered after several years forgotten, usually being the target of jokes through a shitposting group on Facebook. Most of the jokes were due to the art style (considered weird by many people, mainly due to the phallic shape of the eyes), and, mainly due to the fact of being hyper-evangelical, with religious fanaticism and the constant name-calling to any character, especially Dudão, both for being evangelical and for being obese. What explains the name-calling is that, in the 90s, not much was discussed about racism, homophobia and other prejudices, and nowadays it would be considered "politically incorrect" hence the controversy involved. The comics were also criticized by many for considering the series too similar to Monica's Gang. A fandub of the comics made by the YouTube channel "Luan.G.B 2003" also helped to popularize the comics, giving voices and personality to the characters.

References 

Brazilian comics titles
Child characters in comics
Christian comics
Internet memes
Religious controversies in comics
1992 comics debuts